Zaira Romero (born 1999) is a Spanish actress, best known for her role in 2018 drama film Carmen & Lola.

Filmography

Film

Television

References

External links

1999 births
Living people
Spanish film actresses
21st-century Spanish actresses